The Afghanistan cricket team toured Bangladesh to play the Bangladesh cricket team in September 2019 in a one-off Test match. The Bangladesh Cricket Board (BCB) confirmed the schedule for the tour in August 2019.

Following the 2019 Cricket World Cup, where Afghanistan lost all of their matches, Rashid Khan was named as the new captain of the Afghanistan cricket team across all three formats. Khan was 20 years and 350 days old when he led the side in the one-off Test, becoming the youngest cricketer to captain a team in a Test match. On the first day of the match, Rahmat Shah became the first batsman to score a century for Afghanistan in a Test. During the one-off Test match, Afghanistan's Mohammad Nabi announced his retirement from Test cricket, to allow him to focus on white-ball cricket.

Afghanistan won the one-off Test match by 224 runs. It was Afghanistan's second win in Test cricket, their first overseas, and Rashid Khan became the youngest captain to win a Test match. Bangladesh started the fifth and final day of the match on 136/6, with Afghanistan needing just four wickets to win. Play did not start until after 4pm local time, with Afghanistan taking the wickets they needed to win the Test match in the 18.3 overs that were scheduled to be bowled. Rashid Khan was named the player of the match, which he dedicated the award to the retiring Mohammad Nabi.

Squads

Tour match

Only Test

References

External links
 Series home at ESPN Cicinfo

2019 in Afghan cricket
2019 in Bangladeshi cricket
International cricket competitions in 2019–20
Afghan cricket tours of Bangladesh